Aliqa or Al-Ullayqah  is a Syrian village located in Baniyas District, Tartus. According to the Syria Central Bureau of Statistics (CBS), Aliqa had a population of 720 in the 2004 census. The village has Aleika Castle which dates back to the Nizari Ismaili state.

References 

Populated places in Baniyas District